Narvik Church is a parish church of the Church of Norway in Narvik Municipality in Nordland county, Norway. It is located in the town of Narvik. It is the main church for the Narvik parish as well as the seat of the Ofoten prosti (deanery) in the Diocese of Sør-Hålogaland. The large, stone church was built in a long church style in 1925 using plans drawn up by the architect Olaf Nordhagen. The church seats about 700 people.

Media gallery

See also
List of churches in Sør-Hålogaland

References

External links

Narvik
Churches in Nordland
Stone churches in Norway
20th-century Church of Norway church buildings
Churches completed in 1925
1925 establishments in Norway
Long churches in Norway